Azizabad (also Romanized as ‘Azīzābād) is a village in Farmahin Rural District, in the Central District of Farahan County, Markazi Province, Iran. At the 2006 census, its population was 503, in 148 families.

References 

Populated places in Farahan County